Pasni Airport  is a domestic airport, located at Pasni City, Balochistan, Pakistan.

It is reported that the United States Department of Defense may have had some presence at the site.

See also 
 List of airports in Pakistan

References

External links

Airports in Balochistan, Pakistan